Nukanan Dam  is a gravity concrete & fill dam (compound) dam located in Hokkaido Prefecture in Japan. The dam is used for power production. The catchment area of the dam is 368.8 km2. The dam impounds about 19  ha of land when full and can store 665 thousand cubic meters of water. The construction of the dam was completed in 1960.

References

Dams in Hokkaido